Nika Daalderop (born 29 November 1998) is a Dutch volleyball player for Vakıfbank S.K. and the Dutch national team.

She participated at the 2016 Montreux Volley Masters, and 2017 Women's European Volleyball Championship.

References

1998 births
Living people
Dutch expatriate sportspeople in Germany
Dutch women's volleyball players
Expatriate volleyball players in Germany
Sportspeople from Amsterdam
Serie A1 (women's volleyball) players